Karune Illada Kanoonu is a 1983 Indian Kannada-language film, directed by K. S. L. Swamy (Ravee) and produced by Girija. The film stars Lokesh, Tiger Prabhakar, Sripriya and Ashok. The film has musical score by Shankar–Ganesh. The film was an adaptation of K. Balachander's play Major Chandrakanth.

Cast

Lokesh
Tiger Prabhakar
Sripriya as Kavitha
Ashok in Special Appearance
Shivaram
Chandrashekar
Sudheer
Balagangadhara Thilak
Shivaprakash
Ashwath Narayan
Saikumar
Tomato Somu
Veerendra Kumar
Pranavamurthy
Ramesh
Kokila

Soundtrack
The music was composed by Shankar–Ganesh.

References

External links
 

1983 films
1980s Kannada-language films
Films scored by Shankar–Ganesh
Films directed by K. S. L. Swamy